The 2006 Peace Queen Cup was first edition of Peace Queen Cup. It was held from October 28 to November 4, 2006 in South Korea.

Venues

Group stage 
All times are Korean Standard Time (KST) – UTC+9

Group A

Group B

Final

Awards

Winners

Individual awards

Scorers 
6 goals:
  Christine Sinclair

3 goals:
  Kristine Lilly

2 goals:
  Patrizia Panico

1 goal:

  Caitlin Munoz
  Sarah Walsh
  Angelica
  Nilda
  Roseli
  Suzana
  Martina Franko
  Randee Hermus
  Jodi-Ann Robinson
  Rhian Wilkinson
  Camilla Sand Andersen
  Maja Juliussen
  Janne Madsen
  Johanna Rasmussen
  Valentina Boni
  Giulia Perelli
  Hong Kyung-Suk
  Park Eun-Jung
  Natasha Kai
  Lindsay Tarpley
  Cat Whitehill

Own goal:
  Hong Kyung-Suk (for Italy)

External links 
 2006 Peace Queen Cup 
 2006 Peace Queen Cup in RSSSF.com

2006
2006 in women's association football
2006 in South Korean football
2006–07 in Italian women's football
2006–07 in Danish women's football
2006–07 in Dutch women's football
2006–07 in Australian women's soccer
2006 in American women's soccer
2006 in Canadian women's soccer
2006 in Brazilian women's football